Interlude is the second studio album by Northern Irish musician, songwriter and record producer David Lyttle.

Track listing
All songs produced by David Lyttle.

References

David Lyttle albums
2012 albums